Dorothea von Anhalt-Zerbst (25 September 1607, Zerbst – 26 September 1634, Hitzacker) was a member of the House of Askanier and a princess of Anhalt-Zerbst and Duchess of Brunswick-Wolfenbüttel by marriage to Augustus the Younger.

Life 
Dorothea was the daughter of Prince Rudolf of Anhalt-Zerbst (1576–1621) from his first marriage to Dorothea Hedwig (1587–1609), daughter of the Duke Henry Julius of Brunswick-Wolfenbüttel.

On 26 October 1623 she married in Zerbst with Duke August the Younger of Brunswick-Wolfenbüttel (1579–1666).  This was August's second marriage.  His first marriage had remained childless, like that of his brother Julius Ernest.  With the birth of her sons,  Dorothea thus became the ancestress of the "New House of Brunswick", which became extinct in 1873.  The family tree of the Duchess, as of 1617, can still be found in the library in Wolfenbüttel.

Offspring 
From her marriage with Augustus, Dorothy had the following children:
 Henry August (1625–1627)
 Rudolph August (1627–1704), Duke of Brunswick-Lüneburg and Duke of Brunswick-Wolfenbüttel
 married firstly, in 1650 Countess Christiane Elisabeth of Barby (1634-1681)
 married secondly, in 1681 Rosine Elisabeth Menthe (1663-1701)
 Sibylle Ursula (1629–1671)
 married in 1663 Duke Christian of Schleswig-Holstein-Glücksburg (1627-1698, son of Philip, Duke of Schleswig-Holstein-Sonderburg-Glücksburg)
 Klara Auguste (1632–1700)
 married in 1653 Duke Frederick of Württemberg-Neuenstadt (1615-1682)
 Anton Ulrich (1633–1714), Duke of Brunswick-Wolfenbüttel
 married in 1656 princess Elisabeth Juliane of Schleswig-Holstein-Norburg (1634-1704)

See also 
 Anhalt
 Askanier

References 
 William Havemann: History of the territories Brunswick and Lüneburg, Dieterich, 1855, p. 712
 Edward Vehse: History of the courts of the House of Brunswick in Germany and England, Hoffmann und Campe, 1853, p. 164

Footnotes 

Duchesses of Brunswick-Wolfenbüttel
1607 births
1634 deaths
House of Ascania
New House of Brunswick
People from Zerbst
Daughters of monarchs